The Red Sea dam is a speculative macro-engineering proposal put forward in 2007 by a group of scientists and engineers. Although the authors' intentions are to explore "the ethical and environmental dilemmas and some of the political implications of macro-engineering", the proposal has attracted both criticism and ridicule.

Proposal 
Natural evaporation would rapidly lower the level of the enclosed Red Sea. The dam would also lower the Red Sea by about 2.1 meters per year (6.8 feet per year). Water rushing back into the sea would then drive turbines to generate electricity. The dam would have the potential to generate 50 gigawatts of emissions-free hydroelectric power. In comparison, the largest nuclear power plant in the United States has an output of 3.2 gigawatts.

Implications 
The proposal's authors point out that "Macro-engineering projects of this size cause massive destruction of existing ecologies", a point emphasized by critics who note the damage caused by current, far smaller schemes.

The authors also note the benefits of the project. Besides helping to satisfy the region's growing energy needs, there are environmental benefits to the scheme: "On the positive side of the environmental scale, however, are the big reductions of greenhouse gas emissions, and the reduced pace of fossil hydrocarbon resource exhaustion".

Influential scientists such as Peter Bosshard, policy director of International Rivers in California, condemned the scheme as ludicrous.

See also 
 Atlantropa
 Bridge of the Horns
 Hydroelectricity
 Qattara Depression Project

References

External links 
 Gibraltar Strait Dam Macroprojects by Richard Cathcart, one of the authors of the Red Sea Dam proposal.

Macro-engineering
Dam controversies
Proposed dams
Hydroelectricity
Red Sea